The discography of Rocko, an American rapper, consists of one studio album, 13 mixtapes and 13 singles (including 12 as a featured artist) and 13 (music videos)

Albums

Studio album

Mixtapes

Singles

As lead artist

As featured artist

Other charted songs

Guest appearances

Music videos

References

Discographies of American artists
Hip hop discographies